The Tate & Lyle Sugar Silo is a Grade II* listed building on Regent Road at Huskisson Dock in Kirkdale, north Liverpool, England.

Henry Tate established his Liverpool refinery in 1872, and Tate & Lyle built their huge concrete sugar silo in the 1950s, close to the Liverpool docks.  A huge conveyor tower was constructed next to it, and this was used to bring sugar up from ships in Huskisson Dock. The sugar was then transported via several other conveyors into the top of the silo.

Once in the silo, an overhead railway system was used to distribute the sugar along the length of the silo. The hopper ran along on a track, depositing the sugar through big grilles positioned between the rails. In 2009 the silo tower was in a state of disrepair and was on the Buildings at Risk Register, although as of 2022 it no longer features there. The silo itself is still used.

References

External links

 Historical record from the National Monuments Record
 Tate and Lyle images from the National Monuments Record

Tate & Lyle
Liverpool docks
Grade II* listed buildings in Liverpool
History of sugar
Brutalist architecture in Liverpool